Joseph Stanton is a Professor of Art History and American Studies at the University
of Hawaii at Mānoa and a widely published poet.

His poems have appeared in Poetry, Poetry East, Harvard Review, Ekphrasis, New York Quarterly, Antioch Review, New Letters, and many other journals
and anthologies.

Biography
Joseph Charles Stanton, born February 4, 1949, in St. Louis, Missouri, is a poet and a scholar who taught art history and American studies at the University of Hawaii at Mānoa where he is a Professor Emeritus. He has published extensively on American art, literature, and culture. One of his special areas of work concerns the intersection of the visual and literary arts. His essays on image-word topics have been appeared in such journals as Art Criticism, American Art, Journal of American Culture, Harvard Library Bulletin, The Lion and the Unicorn, Soundings, Children's Literature, and Michigan Quarterly Review. He has also written on baseball topics for such journals as Nine, Spitball, and Aethlon. 

As an art historian, Stanton has published essays on Edward Hopper, Winslow Homer, Maurice Sendak, Chris Van Allsburg, Edward Gorey, and many other artists.

Joseph Stanton's books of poems include A Field Guide to the Wildlife of Suburban Oahu, Cardinal Points, Imaginary Museum: Poems on Art, and What the Kite Thinks. He has published more than 300 poems in such journals as Poetry, Harvard Review, Poetry East, The Cortland Review, Ekphrasis, Bamboo Ridge, Elysian Fields Quarterly, Endicott Studio's Journal of the Mythic Arts, and New York Quarterly. In 2007, Ted Kooser selected one of Stanton's poems for his "American Life in Poetry" column. Under the guidance of Makoto Ooka, he participated with Wing Tek Lum and Jean Toyama in the collaborative renshi poem What the Kite Thinks. His next book of poems, Lifelines: Poems for Winslow Homer and Edward Hopper, will be published by Shanti Arts Publishing in 2023. 

His 2005 book, The Important Books: Children's Picture Books as Art and Literature, he examines the picture-books of such artist-writers as Maurice Sendak, Chris Van Allsburg, Arnold Lobel, and William Joyce. His 2011 book, Looking for Edward Gorey, is the culmination of his many years of research into all things Gorey. His other books include Prevailing Winds, Moving Pictures, Things Seen, Imaginary Museum: Poems on Art, A Field Guide to the Wildlife of Suburban Oahu: Poems, Cardinal Points: Poems on St. Louis Cardinals Baseball, What the Kite Thinks: A Linked Poem, Stan Musial: A Biography, and A Hawaii Anthology.

Awards and honors
In 1997, Stanton received the Cades Award for his contributions to the literature of Hawaii.

In 2010, Stanton received the  Tony Quagliano International Poetry Award from the Hawaii Council for the Humanities.

In 2014, he was selected for the Ekphrasis Prize by Ekphrasis magazine.

In 2015, he won the James Vaughan Poetry Award by Hawaii Pacific Review.

In 2018, Stanton was given the Loretta Petrie Award for his contribution to the literary community in Hawaii.

Stanton's A Hawaii Anthology, won a Ka Palapala Po'okela Award for excellence in literature. Two of his other books have won honorable mention Ka Palapala Po'okela Awards.

Poems selected for anniversary ("best of") anthologies: Poetry East (2000), Hawaii Pacific Review (1998), Long Island Quarterly (1997, 1994), Bamboo Ridge (1986), First Place, Hawaii Pacific Review Poetry Contest, 1995.

One of the winners of the Poetry on the Bus Competition, sponsored by the Arts Council of Hawaii and the City of Honolulu, 1988.

Books

Poetry collections
Solo Publications
Prevailing Winds, Shanti Arts Publications, 2022
 Moving Pictures, Shanti Artis Publications, 2019
 Things Seen, Brick Road Poetry Press, 2016
A Field Guide to the Wildlife of Suburban Oahu, Time Being Books, 2006
 Cardinal Points: Poems on St. Louis Cardinals Baseball, McFarland and Company, 2002
Imaginary Museum: Poems on Art, Time Being Books, 1999

Collaborative Book
What the Kite Thinks: A Linked Poem by Ooka Makoto, Wing Tek Lum, Joseph Stanton, and Jean Yamasaki Toyama, University of Hawaii, 1994

Anthologies and Collections
 Paumanok: Transition, Island Sound Press, 2022
 Poets Speaking to Poets: Echoes and Tributes, ed. by Nicholas Fargnoli and Robert Hamblin, 2021
 From the Farther Shore: Cape Code & the Islands Through Poetry, ed. by Alice Kociemba, Robin Smith-Johnson, and Rich Youmans, 2021
 Double Features: Big Ideas in Film, Great Books Foundation, 2017
 Paumanok, Island Sound Press, ed. by Kathaleen Donnelly, 2022, 2013, and 2009
 Heart of the Order: Baseball Poems, ed. by Gabriel Fried, Persea Books, 2014
Collecting Life: Poets on Objects Known and Imagined edited by Madelyn Garner and Andrea Watson, 2010
Troll's-Eye View: A Book of Villainous Tales, ed. by Ellen Datlow and Terri Windling, Viking-Penguin,  2009
Paumanok: Poems and Pictures of Long Island, ed. By Kathaleen Donnelly, Cross-Cultural Communications, 2009
 We Go Eat: A Mixed Plate from Hawaii's Food Culture, ed. Craig Howes and Susan Yim, 2008
 Honolulu Stories, ed. Gavan Daws, 2008
 Sinatra:...but buddy, I'm kind of a poem, ed. Gilbert L. Gigliotti. Washington D.C.: Entasis Press, 2007
 "Gondola Signore Gondola": Venezia nella poesia americana del Novecento, ed. and trans. Mamoli Zorzi Rosella, Supernova Edizioni, 2007
 Horsehide, Pigskin, Oval Tracks, and Apple Pie, ed. James Vlaisch, McFarland, 2006
 Mona Poetica: A Poetry Anthology, ed. Diane DeCillis and Mary Jo Gillet, 2005
Line Drives: 100 Contemporary Baseball Poems, ed. Brook Horvath and Tim Wiles, 2001
 Of Frogs and Toads: Poems and Short Prose Pieces Featuring Amphibians, ed. Jill Carpenter, 1998
 Fire in the Sea, ed. Sue Cowing, Honolulu Museum of Art, 1996
 Dumb Beautiful Ministers, ed. William Heyen, Birnham Wood Graphics, 1996.
 In Autumn:  A Collection of Long Island Poetry, ed. George Wallace, Birnham Wood Press, 1994
Best of Bamboo Ridge, ed. by Eric Chock and Darrell Lum, Bamboo Ridge Press, 1986

Scholarly Books
 Looking for Edward Gorey, University of Hawaii Art Gallery, 2011
 Stan Musial: A Biography, Greenwood Press, 2007
 The Important Books: Children's Picture Books as Art and Literature, Scarecrow Press, 2005

Books Edited 
 The Quietest Singing, (with Darrell H. Y. Lum and Estelle Enoki), University of Hawaii Press, 2000
 A Hawaii Anthology, University of Hawaii Press, 1997
 The Ten Rules of Fishing, (with James Harstad), Bamboo Ridge Press, 1985
 British & European Literature, Vol. I, II, & III, 1983

References 

 Kunstpedia entry on Joseph Stanton
 The Poetry of Joseph Stanton: Words Meet Images
 Ekphrastic Interview with Joseph Stanton
 Nights on B Street
 Vice-Versa on "Nights on B Street"
 Local Poet Joseph Stanton turns to the natural world for inspiration
 Time Being Books page for Joseph Stanton's publications
 Bamboo Ridge contributor list for Joseph Stanton
 UH professor mixes poetry, baseball in his new book
 Catcher in the Wry: Baseball Poems
 Our forever pastime
 Review of Abraxas, Vol. 47, 2010

External links

Joseph Stanton's work online

Baseball poems
 The Space-Time Continuum and The Slow Eye of Stan The Man
 Playing at Cartwright Field, Honolulu
 Jackie Robinson Stealing Home
 The Early Youth of Babe Ruth
 Five Poems on Baseball Art
 Baseball Is For All Seasons
 Edward Hopper's Night Hawks Consider the 1942 World Series

Poems about Hawaii
 Banana Trees featured by Ted Kooser, U.S. Poet Laureate
 Mejiro

Poems on Art
 Edward Hopper's New York Movie
 Nighthawks as Noir
 Jacob Wrestling with an Angel
 Winslow Homer Painting a Summer Night 
 Five Paintings by Winslow Homer 
 Rene Magritte's Infinite Recognition
 Rene Magritte's The Unexpected Answer 
 Pieter Bruegel's The Harvesters 
 Joseph Stella Painting Brooklyn Bridge
 Edward Hopper's Early Sunday Morning
 John Frederick Kensett's On the Connecticut Shore
 Winslow Homer's Paris Courtyard
 The Poetry of Joseph Stanton

Fairy Tale Poems

 Collection of Fairy Tale poems on Endicott Studio Journal of Mythic Arts

Poems on Movies and Music
 The Killers
 Groundhog Day
 Vertigo
 For Sinatra in the Wee Small Hours

Poems on Writers and Writing
 Librarian of the Night
 Storm at Cedarmere
 

American male poets
1949 births
Living people